Rhodinol is the chemical compound 3,7-dimethyloct-7-en-1-ol. As the (3S) isomer it is CAS 6812-78-8, and as the racemate it is CAS 141-25-3.

In the field of perfumery materials, the term may refer to L-citronellol, to mixtures comprising mostly L- or racemic citronellol and geraniol, or to mixtures comprising mostly racemic 3,7-dimethyloct-7-en-1-ol and racemic citronellol.

Two example synthetic Rhodinol products are Rhodinol 70, a racemic mixture comprising 40-60% 3,7-dimethyloct-7-en-1-ol and 40-60% citronellol, and Sigma-Aldrich Rhodinol, which consists of L-citronellol and geraniol.

Rhodinol is also provided in perfumery in natural grades as materials extracted from geranium or citronella, comprising principally citronellol and geraniol.

Rhodinol products are used in cosmetics and perfumery to impart flowery odors, particularly but not limited to being a component of rosy odor.

3,7-Dimethyloct-7-en-1-ol does not appear substantively in nature.

See also
 Citronellol
 Geraniol
 Perfume allergy

References

Alkenols
Monoterpenes
Perfume ingredients